KPCS may refer to:

 Kevin Pollak's Chat Show
 Kiloparsecs, Units of measurement used in astronomy
 Kimberley Process Certification Scheme
 Korean Personal Communications Service
 KPCS (FM), a radio station (89.7 FM) licensed to serve Princeton, Minnesota, United States